Victor-Amédée Lebesgue, sometimes written Le Besgue, (2 October 1791,  Grandvilliers (Oise) – 10 June 1875,  Bordeaux (Gironde)) was a mathematician working on number theory. He was elected a member of the Académie des sciences in 1847.

See also
 Catalan's conjecture
 Proof of Fermat's Last Theorem for specific exponents
 Lebesgue–Nagell type equations

Publications

References

LEBESGUE , Victor Amédée

1791 births
1875 deaths
19th-century French mathematicians
Number theorists